Shavakand (also Romanized as Shavākand and Shewakand) is a village in Mud Rural District, Mud District, Sarbisheh County, South Khorasan Province, Iran. At the 2006 census its population was 143, in 51 families.

References 

Populated places in Sarbisheh County